Allnutt is a surname. Notable people with the surname include:

 Albert Allnutt (1892–1963), Australian politician
 Gillian Allnutt (born 1949), English poet 
 John Allnutt (1773–1863), British wine merchant and art collector
 Marion Ellen Lea Allnutt (1896–1980), welfare worker
 Wendy Allnutt (born 1946), English stage and screen actress
 Yari Allnutt (born 1970), American soccer player

See also
 Mark Alnutt, director of athletics for the University at Buffalo